The Capacitance Electronic Disc (CED) is an analog video disc playback system developed by Radio Corporation of America (RCA), in which video and audio could be played back on a TV set using a special stylus and high-density groove system similar to phonograph records.

First conceived in 1964, the CED system was widely seen as a technological success which was able to increase the density of a long-playing record by two orders of magnitude. Despite this achievement, the CED system fell victim to poor planning, various conflicts with RCA management, and several technical difficulties that slowed development and stalled production of the system for 17 years—until 1981, by which time it had already been made obsolete by laser videodisc (DiscoVision, later called LaserVision and LaserDisc) as well as Betamax and VHS video cassette formats. Sales for the system were nowhere near projected estimates. In the spring of 1984, RCA announced it was discontinuing player production, but continued the production of videodiscs until 1986, losing an estimated $650 million in the process. RCA had initially intended to release the SKT425 CED player with their high end Dimensia system in late 1984, but cancelled CED player production  prior to the Dimensia system's release.

The format was commonly known as "videodisc", leading to much confusion with the contemporaneous LaserDisc format. LaserDiscs are read optically with a laser beam, whereas CED discs are read physically with a stylus (similar to a conventional phonograph record). The two systems are mutually incompatible.

RCA used the brand name "SelectaVision" for the CED system, a name also used for some early RCA brand VCRs, and other experimental projects at RCA. The Video High Density system is similar to that of CED.

History

Beginnings and release 
RCA began developing the videodisc system in 1964, in an attempt to produce a phonograph-like method of reproducing video under the name 'Discpix'. Research and development was slow in the early years, as the RCA CED team originally consisted of only four men, but by 1972, the CED team had produced a disc capable of holding ten minutes of color video (a portion of the Get Smart episode "A Tale of Two Tails", re-titled "Lum Fong").

The first CED prototype discs were multi-layered, consisting of a vinyl substrate, nickel conductive layer, glow-discharge insulating layer and silicone lubricant top layer.  Failure to fully solve the stylus/disc wear and manufacturing complexity forced RCA to seek simpler construction of the disc.  The final disc was crafted using PVC blended with carbon to make the disc conductive.  To preserve stylus and groove life, a thin layer of silicone was applied to the disc as a lubricant.

CED videodiscs were originally conceived as being housed in jackets and handled by hand similar to LP records, but during testing it was shown that exposure to dust caused skipped grooves. If dust was allowed to settle on the discs, the dust would absorb moisture from the air and cement the dust particle to the disc surface, causing the stylus to jump back in a locked groove situation. Thus, an idea was developed in which the disc would be stored and handled in a plastic caddy from which the CED would be extracted by the player so that exposure to dust would be minimized.

After 17 years of research and development, the first CED player (model SFT100W) went on sale on March 22, 1981. A catalog of approximately 50 videodisc titles was released at the same time. The first title to be manufactured was Race for Your Life, Charlie Brown. Fifteen months later, RCA released the SGT200 and SGT250 players, both with stereo sound while the SGT-250 was also the first CED player model to include a wireless remote control. Models with random access were introduced in 1983.

Demise 
Several problems doomed the CED system before it was even introduced.  From the early development of the CED system, it was clear that VCRs and home videotape—with their longer storage capacity and recording capabilities—posed a threat to the system.  However, development pushed ahead. Once released, sales for the CED players were slow. When the system was formally announced in late 1979, RCA had projected annual sales of between 5 and 6 million players and 200 to 500 million videodiscs. The company had expected to sell 200,000 players by the end of 1981, but only about half that number had been sold, and there was little improvement in sales throughout 1982 and 1983. 

The extremely long period of development—caused in part by political turmoil and a great deal of turnover in the high management of RCA—also contributed to the demise of the CED system.  RCA had originally slated the videodisc system for a 1977 release.  The discs were not able to hold more than 30 minutes of video per side, and the nickel-like material used to make discs was not sturdy enough for manufacture.  Signal degradation was an issue, as handling the discs was causing them to deteriorate more rapidly than expected, baffling engineers.

Adding onto the issues was the length of the discs; sixty minutes per side rendered it impossible for most movies over 120 minutes to be released on one CED disc. This was easily attainable on VHS and Betamax, as a T-120 VHS, for example (which holds two hours and four minutes of tape), could carry most of these movies. However, this was not the case on CED. Many popular films such as some of the James Bond series, Mary Poppins, Return of the Jedi and Star Trek: The Motion Picture had to be released on two CED discs. All three of these examples were typically seen on one VHS/Betamax cassette. 

RCA had projected that by 1985, CED players would be in close to 50% of American homes, but the sales of players continued to drop. RCA cut the prices of CED players and offered incentives to consumers such as rebates and free discs, but sales only slightly improved. RCA management realized that the system would never be profitable and announced the discontinuation of production of CED players on April 4, 1984.  Remaining stocks of players were sold by dealers and liquidation retailers for as little as $20 each. Unexpectedly, demand for the videodiscs themselves suddenly became high immediately after the announcement; RCA alerted dealers 
and customers that videodiscs would continue to be manufactured and new titles released for at least another three years after the discontinuation of players. Less than a year after this announcement, the sale of discs began to decline, prompting RCA to abandon videodisc production after only two years, in 1986.
The last titles released were The Jewel of the Nile by CBS/Fox Video, and Memories of VideoDisc, a commemorative CED given to many RCA employees involved with the CED project, both in 1986.

Technology 

To avoid metric names they are usually called "12 inch discs". A CED has a spiral groove on both sides. The groove is 657 nm wide and has a length of up to 12 miles (19 km). The discs rotate  at a constant angular speed during playback (450 rpm for NTSC, 375 rpm for PAL)  and each rotation contains 8 interlaced fields, or 4 full frames of video. These appear as spokes on the disc surface, with the gap between each field clearly visible under certain light. This meant that freeze frame was impossible on players without an expensive electronic frame store facility.

A keel-shaped stylus with a titanium electrode layer rides in the groove with extremely light tracking force (65 mg) and an electronic circuit is formed through the disc and stylus. Like an audio turntable, the stylus reads the disc, starting at the outer edge and going towards the center. The video and audio signals are stored on the Videodiscs in a composite analog signal which is encoded into vertical undulations in the bottom of the groove, somewhat like pits. These undulations have a shorter wavelength than the length of the stylus tip in the groove, and the stylus rides over them; the varying distance between the stylus tip and the conductive surface due to the depth of the undulations in the groove under the stylus directly controls the capacitance between the stylus and the conductive carbon-loaded PVC disc. This varying capacitance in turn alters the frequency of a resonant circuit, producing an FM electrical signal, which is then decoded into video and audio signals by the player's electronics.

The capacitive stylus pickup system which gives the CED its name can be contrasted with the technology of the conventional phonograph.  Whereas the phonograph stylus physically vibrates with the variations in the record groove, and those vibrations are converted by a mechanical transducer (the phono pickup) to an electrical signal, the CED stylus normally does not vibrate and moves only to track the CED groove (and the disc surface—out-of-plane), while the signal from the stylus is natively obtained as an electrical signal.  This more sophisticated system, combined with a high revolution rate, is necessary to enable the encoding of video signals with bandwidth of a few megahertz, compared to a maximum of 20 kilohertz for an audio-only signal—a difference of two orders of magnitude.  Also, while the undulations in the bottom of the groove may be likened to pits, it is important to note that the spacing of vertical wave crests and troughs in a CED groove is continuously variable, as the CED is an analog medium. Usually, the term "pits", when used in the context of information media, refers to features with sharply defined edges and discrete lengths and depths, such as the pits on digital optical media such as CDs and DVDs.

In order to maintain an extremely light tracking force, the stylus arm is surrounded by coils, which sense deflection, and a circuit in the player responds to the signals from these coils by moving the stylus head carriage in steps as the groove pulls the stylus across the disc. Other coils are used to deflect the stylus, to finely adjust tracking. This system is very similar to—yet predates—the one used in Compact Disc players to follow the spiral optical track, where typically a servo motor moves the optical pickup in steps for coarse tracking and a set of coils shifts the laser lens for fine tracking, both guided by an optical sensing device, which is the analogue of CED stylus-deflection sensing coils. For the CED player, this tracking arrangement has the additional benefit that the stylus drag angle remains uniformly tangent to the groove, unlike the case for a phonograph tonearm, in which the stylus drag angle and consequently the stylus side force varies with the tonearm angle, which in turn depends on the radial position on the record of the stylus. Whereas for a phonograph, where the stylus has a pinpoint tip, linear tracking is merely ideal to reduce wear of records and styli and to maximize tracking stability, for a CED player linear tracking is a necessity for the keel-shaped stylus, which must always stay tangent to the groove. Furthermore, the achievement of an extremely light tracking force on the CED stylus enables the use of a fine groove pitch (i.e. fine spacing of adjacent revolutions of the spiral), necessary to provide a long playing time at the required high rotational speed, while also limiting the rate of disc and stylus wear.

The disc is stored inside a caddy, from which the player extracts it when it is loaded. The disc itself is surrounded by a "spine", a plastic ring (actually square on the outside edge) with a thick, straight rim-like edge, which extends outside of, and latches into, the caddy. When a person inserts a caddy containing a disc into the player, the player captures the spine, and both the disc and the spine are left in the player as the person pulls the caddy out. The inner edges of the opening of the caddy have felt strips designed to catch any dust or other debris that could be on the disc as it is extracted.  Once the caddy has been withdrawn by the person, the player loads the disc onto the turntable, either manually with all SFT and most SGT prefix RCA players or automatically with the RCA SGT-250 and all other models and brands of players. When playback has been started, the player spins the disc up to speed while moving the pickup arm over the disc surface and lowering the stylus onto the beginning of the disc.

When Stop is pressed, the stylus is lifted from the disc and returned to its parking location, and the disc and spine are lifted up again to align with the caddy slot. When ready, the slot is unlocked, and the caddy can be inserted and withdrawn by a person, now with the disc back inside.

Advantages 
CED players, from an early point in their life, appealed to a lower-income market more than VHS, Betamax, and LaserDisc.  The video quality (approximately 3 MHz of luma bandwidth for CED) was comparable to or better than a VHS-SP or Betamax-II video, but sub-par compared to LaserDisc (about 5 MHz of luma bandwidth).

CED players were intended to be "low-cost" because they cost around half as much to manufacture as a VCR and had fewer precision parts.
The discs themselves could be inexpensively duplicated, stamped out on slightly-modified audio 
LP record presses.

Like VCRs, CED videodisc players had features like rapid forward/reverse and visual search forward/reverse. They also had a pause feature, though it blanked the screen rather than displaying a still image; many players featured a "page mode", during which the current block of four successive frames would be repeatedly displayed.

Since CEDs were a disc-based system, they did not require rewinding. Early discs were available only in  monophonic sound, but many later discs were issued in stereo sound. (Mono CED discs were packaged in white protective caddies, while the caddies for stereo discs were blue.)  Other discs could be switched between two separate mono audio tracks, providing features such as bilingual audio capability.

Like the LaserDisc and DVD, some CEDs feature random access, allowing users to quickly move to certain parts of the movie. Each side of a CED disc could be split into up to 63 "chapters", or bands. Two late RCA players (the SJT400 and SKT400) could access these bands in any given order. Unlike its laser-based counterparts, the chapters in a CED are based on minutes of the film, not scenes.

Novelty discs and CED-based games were produced whereby accessing the chapters in a specified order would string together a different story each time. However, only a few were produced before the halt of CED player manufacturing.

Disadvantages 

In comparison with LaserDisc technology, CEDs suffered from the fact that they were a phonograph-style contact medium: RCA estimated that the number of times a CED could be played back, under ideal conditions, was 500. By comparison, a clean, laser rot-free LaserDisc could, in theory, be played an unlimited number of times (although repeated or careless  handling could still result in damage). 

Since the CED system used a stylus to read the discs, it was necessary to regularly change the stylus in the player to avoid damage to the videodiscs, while worn and damaged discs also caused problems for consumers. When a disc began to wear, video and audio quality would severely decline, and the disc would begin to skip.  Several discs suffered from a condition called "video virus", where a CED would skip a great deal due to dust particles stuck in the grooves of the disc. However, playing the disc several times would generally solve this problem.

Unlike VHS tapes, CEDs (along with LaserDisc) required a disc flip (however, some LaserDisc players were able to read both sides of the disc without physically flipping the disc, achieved by moving the laser from one side of the disc to the other, but this still resulted in a pause of playback during the change) at some point during the course of almost all films as only sixty minutes of video could be stored per side (75 mins on UK PAL discs due to the slower rotation speed); if a feature ran over two hours, it would be necessary to spread the feature over two discs. 

In some cases, if a movie's theatrical running time was only slightly longer than two hours, studios would often trim short scenes throughout the movie and/or employ time compression (speeding the extra run time out of the film) in order to avoid the expense of issuing two discs.

This problem was not unique to CEDs: LaserDiscs presented the same difficulty, and some longer features, such as The Ten Commandments (1956), still required more than one tape or disc in the VHS, Beta, and LaserDisc formats. There were no two-disc UK PAL releases.

Less significant disadvantages include lack of support for freeze-frame during pause, since CEDs scanned four frames in one rotation versus one frame per rotation on CAV LaserDisc, while computer technology was not advanced enough at the time to outfit the player with a framebuffer affordably. However, a "page mode" was available on many players that would allow those four frames to be repeated in an endless loop.

CEDs were also larger than VHS tapes, thicker than LaserDiscs, and considerably heavier due to the plastic caddies.

Available material

Players 
CED players were manufactured by four companies—RCA, Hitachi, Sanyo, and Toshiba—but seven other companies marketed players manufactured by these companies.

Media 
Upon release, 50 titles were available for the CED; along with RCA (which included the company's partnership with Columbia Pictures plus Paramount and Disney releases), CBS Video Enterprises (later CBS/FOX Video) produced the first 50 titles. Eventually, Disney, Metro-Goldwyn-Mayer, Paramount Pictures, MCA, Vestron Video, and other labels began to produce CED discs under their own home video labels, and did so until the end of disc manufacturing in 1986.

Market reception 
Capacitance Electronic Disc's competitors, Philips/Magnavox and Pioneer, instead manufactured optical discs, read with lasers. On April 4, 1984, after sales of only 550,000 players, RCA announced the discontinuation of CED videodisc players. RCA's losses since the product's introduction were eventually estimated at $650 million. The huge financial losses partially resulted in General Electric's acquisition of RCA in 1986, and the abandonment of the "SelectaVision" brand on all RCA video products.

See also 
 Videotape format war
 Video High Density

References

Further reading 
 Cowie, Jefferson R. Capital Moves: RCA's Seventy-Year Quest for Cheap Labor. Ithaca, N.Y.: Cornell University Press, 1999. .
 Daynes, Rob and Beverly Butler. The VideoDisc Book: A Guide and Directory. New York: John Wiley and Sons, 1984. .
 DeBloois, Michael L., ed. VideoDisc/Microcomputer Courseware Design. Englewood Cliffs, N.J.: Educational Technology Publications, 1982. .
 Floyd, Steve, and Beth Floyd, eds. The Handbook of Interactive Video. White Plains, NY: Knowledge Industry Publications. 1982. .
 Graham, Margaret B.W. RCA and the VideoDisc: The Business of Research. (Also as: The Business of Research: RCA and the VideoDisc.) Cambridge: Cambridge University Press, 1986. , .
 Haynes, George R. Opening Minds: The Evolution of Videodiscs & Interactive Learning. Dubuque, Iowa: Kendall/Hunt Publishing Co., 1989. .
 Howe, Tom. CED Magic: The RCA VideoDisc Collector's Guide. Portland, OR: CED Magic, 1999. . (CD-ROM)
 Isailović, Jordan. VideoDisc and Optical Memory Systems. Englewood Cliffs, N.J.: Prentice-Hall, 1985. .
 Lardner, James. Fast Forward: Hollywood, the Japanese, and the VCR Wars. (Also as: Fast Forward: Hollywood, the Japanese, and the Onslaught of the VCR.) New York: W. W. Norton & Co., 1987. .
 Lenk, John D. Complete Guide to Laser/VideoDisc Player Troubleshooting and Repair. Englewood Cliffs, N.J.: Prentice-Hall, 1985. .
 Schneider, Edward W., and Junius L. Brennion. The Instructional Media Library: VideoDiscs (Volume 16). Englewood Cliffs, NJ: Educational Technology Publications. . 1981.
 Sigel, Efrem, Mark Schubin and Paul F. Merrill. Video Discs: The Technology, the Applications and the Future. White Plains, N.Y.: Knowledge Industry Publications, 1980. . .
 Sobel, Robert. RCA. New York: Stein and Day/Publishers, 1986. .
 Sonnenfeldt, Richard. Mehr als ein Leben (More than One Life). ?, 2003. . 
 Journals:
 Video Computing
 The Videodisc Monitor
 Videodisc News
 Videodisc/Optical Disk Magazine

External links 

 The 'Total Rewind' VCR museum, covering CED and other vintage formats
 RCA VideoDisc Web Site - CED Magic
 The LaserDisc Database - LD/CED/VHD discs, profiling and marketplace
 Electron Microscope Shows How CEDs are played
 Retro tech: The RCA CED Videodisc, Techmoan YouTube Channel, 14 March 2016
The CED (RCA SelectaVision Videodisc), Technology Connections YouTube Channel, September 10, 2019
 RCA model SFT-100W "Selectavision" video disc player - National Museum of American History

Audiovisual introductions in 1981
Discontinued media formats
Products and services discontinued in 1986
RCA brands
Video storage